The 1997 World War 3 was the third World War 3 professional wrestling pay-per-view (PPV) event produced by World Championship Wrestling (WCW). The event took place on November 23, 1997 from The Palace of Auburn Hills in Auburn Hills, Michigan.

Nine matches were contested at the event. The main event was the traditional World War 3 battle royal, in which the winner would receive a future title shot at the WCW World Heavyweight Championship. Scott Hall won by last eliminating The Giant. WCW World Heavyweight Champion Hollywood Hogan was also a participant in the match, who joined the match for himself to prevent anyone from getting the title shot. Hall won after Kevin Nash, in a Sting disguise, attacked Giant with a baseball bat and eliminated him and after Hogan eliminated himself by running away from "Sting". Hall was entitled to receive his title shot at SuperBrawl VIII, but Hogan controversially lost the title to Sting at Starrcade. This resulted in the title being vacated and the two competing in a rematch at SuperBrawl VIII, where Sting won the title. Hall received his title shot at Uncensored in March, where Sting defeated him.

Another important match on the card was Curt Hennig versus Ric Flair in a no disqualification match for the WCW United States Heavyweight Championship. Hennig won the match to retain the title.

Storylines
The event featured wrestlers from pre-existing scripted feuds and storylines. Wrestlers portrayed villains, heroes, or less distinguishable characters in the scripted events that built tension and culminated in a wrestling match or series of matches.

Event

Preliminary matches

If Último Dragón had won his match against Yuji Nagata, he would have gotten 5 minutes alone in the ring with Sonny Onoo. Raven performed three Evenflow DDTs on Scotty Riggs during the match, then ordered the referee to count the unconscious Riggs out. After the match Riggs was carried out of the ring by members of The Flock, marking his entry into the group. Steve McMichael was originally scheduled to face Goldberg for McMichael's Super Bowl XX ring. At Halloween Havoc Queen Debra had given the ring to Goldberg. Prior to the match McMichael attacked Goldberg with a lead pipe and took possession of the ring. McMichael then made a challenge to anyone else to face him, and Debra dragged Alex Wright to the ring against his will to participate in the match.

Main event match
The main event was the World War 3 battle royal, which started with 59 out of 60 wrestlers in the ring. After every wrestler except Scott Hall, Diamond Dallas Page, and The Giant had been eliminated, the WCW World Heavyweight Champion Hollywood Hogan revealed himself to be the sixtieth entry in the battle royal; he did this to win the match for himself so no one would get the title shot. Hall won the match after Kevin Nash, in a Sting disguise, attacked Giant with a baseball bat and eliminated him and after Hogan eliminated himself by running away from "Sting".
After the match, Hogan hit Page twice with Diamond Cutter and celebrated in the ring with Hall and Nash.

Aftermath
As the prematch stipulation of the World War 3 dictated, Hall was to receive his championship match at SuperBrawl VIII; due to a chain of events that followed World War 3, Hall did not receive this shot until Uncensored in March 1998.

Reception
In 2016, Kevin Pantoja of 411Mania gave the event a rating of 4.5 [Poor], stating, "Honestly, I expected a lot worse. The World War 3 match itself is the usual lackluster event, the TV Title was lame and the Mongo stuff completely sucked ass. However, I think that Eddie and Rey had a pretty good match, while Hennig and Flair surprised me with a good old fashioned fight. Even the opener was surprising fun. The rest of the card ranged from decent to solid, meaning I wouldn’t call this a bad show, but I wouldn’t consider it a recommendation either. See the US and Cruiserweight Title matches if you have to see anything."

Results

Notes

External links
World War 3

WCW World War 3
1997 in Michigan
Events in Michigan
Professional wrestling in Auburn Hills, Michigan
1997 World Championship Wrestling pay-per-view events
November 1997 events in the United States